The Victory Bridge or Haghtanak Bridge ( Haght'anaki kamurj) is an arch bridge for traffic linking across the Hrazdan River in Yerevan, Armenia. It connects the Mashtots Avenue in the east with the Admiral Isakov Avenue in the west. It was opened on 25 November 1945 and named the Victory Bridge to commemorate the Soviet victory over Nazi Germany at the end of World War II. 

It was designed by architects A. Mamijanyan and A. Asatryan and consists of seven arches.

References

Bridges in Yerevan
Bridges built in the Soviet Union
Bridges completed in 1945
Road bridges in Armenia